Below is a list of Preston Lions FC players both past and present, ordered alphabetically.

A
  Lupce Acevski
  Nicolas Alvarez
  Les Anastasiou

B
  Antony Burlak
  Michael Burlak

C
  George Campbell (footballer)
  Frank Catalano
  Ricky Chillico
  Oscar Crino

D
  Ian Dobson
  Robbie Dunn
  Pece Dimovski
  Zoran Drogriski

E
  Isyan Erdogan
  Chris Emsovski

F

G
  Marinos Gasparis
  Blaze Georgioski
  Goce Gruevski
  Ersan Gülüm

H

I

J
  Steve Jackson
  George Jolevski

K
  Igor Kolevski

L
  Nick Lazarevski
  John Little
  Goran Lozanovski

M
  George McMillan
  Anthony Magnacca
  John Markovski
  Stephen Masalkovski
  Hrvoje Matkovic
  Bale Micovski
  Daniel Miller
  Michael Miskas
  Jonathan Munoz

N
  Robert Najdovski
Spase Najdovski

O
  Sasa Ognenovski
  Peter Ollerton
  Serkan Oksuz
  Savas Ozdemir

P
  Steven Pace
  Zoran Petrevski
  Serdar Pir
  Victor Pittito
  James Poole

Q

R

S
  John Sapazovski
  Nicholas Schwal
  Naum Sekulovski
  Pece Siveski
  Robert Spasevski
  Warren Spink
  Wayne Spiteri
  Tony Sterjovski
  Aleksandar Stojanovski
  Robert Stojcevski

T
  Gjorgji Todorovski
  Phil Traianedes
  Kris Trajanovski
  Vasco Trpcevski

U

V
  Haris Vrbovac

W

X

Y

Z
  Andrew Zinni

See also

References

External links

Preston Lions
Preston Lions players
Association football player non-biographical articles